Canadian indie pop duo Tegan and Sara have released ten studio albums and thirteen singles. They released their first album, Under Feet Like Ours, independently in 1999. Their first major release was This Business of Art, released in 2000 on Vapor Records. This album contained their debut single, "The First".

Tegan and Sara have four Gold certified albums by Music Canada, formerly the Canadian Recording Industry Association. In addition, three of their seven studio albums have charted in the top five of the Canadian Albums Chart, two peaking at number four and one at number two.

Albums

Studio albums

Extended plays and remix albums

Compilation albums

Video albums

Singles

As primary artist

As featured artist

Promotional singles

Other songs

Other album appearances

Demos

Music videos

Notes

References

External links
 
 

Discographies of Canadian artists
Discography 
 
Pop music group discographies